The Avco AN/FPS-26 Radar was an  Air Defense Command height finder radar developed in the Frequency Diversity Program with a tunable 3-cavity power klystron for electronic counter-countermeasures (e.g. to counter jamming).  Accepted by the Rome Air Development Center on 20 January 1960 for use at SAGE radar stations, the AN/FPS-26 processed height-finder requests (e.g., from Air Defense Direction Centers) by positioning to the azimuth of a target aircraft using a high-pressure hydraulic drive, then "nodding" in either a default automatic mode or by operator command.  The inflatable radome required a minimum pressure to prevent contact with the antenna which would result in damage to both (technicians accessed the antenna deck via an air lock.)  To maintain high dielectric strength, the waveguide was pressurized with sulfur hexafluoride (SF6), which technicians were warned would produce deadly fluorine if waveguide arcing occurred.

FPS-26 units were installed at Luke AFB, MacDill AFB (1961), Hunter AFB (1961), Chandler AFS (1961), Baudette AFS (1963), Las Vegas Air Force Station (1963), Montauk AFS, Lockport AFS (1962), Fort Fisher AFS (1962), Winston-Salem AFS (1962), North Charleston AFS (1961), Aiken AFS, and Sundance AFS. Charleston AFS, Charleston, ME (exact date of installation unknown some time between 1961-1963) Acme Missiles & Construction Corp., Rockville Centre, N.Y. built the radar tower facilities at Missile Master, Pittsburgh Defense Area, Oakdale, Pa.

Variants
A variant was the AN/FPS-26A with better ECCM capabilities. which was installed at Cambria AFS (1963), Klamath AFS (1963), Point Arena AFS, Boron AFS, Hutchinson AFS, North Truro AFS (1963), Calumet AFS, Selfridge AFB, Empire AFS (1963), Finland AFS (1963), Fortuna AFS, Opheim AFS, Highlands AFS, Gibbsboro AFS (1963), Watertown AFS (1963), Saratoga Springs AFS (1963), North Bend AFS, Mt. Hebo AFS, Benton AFS (1963), Oakdale AFS, St. Albans AFS (1963), Manassas AFS (1963), Cape Charles AFS (1963), Minot AFS, and Makah AFS.

In July 1965 for missile warning the AN/FPS-26 was modified to the Avco AN/FSS-7 SLBM Detection Radar for the AVCO 474N SLBM Detection an Warning System.

References

Ground radars
Military radars of the United States
Military equipment introduced in the 1960s